The 1925 USSR Chess Championship was the fourth edition of USSR Chess Championship. Held from 11 August to 6 September in Leningrad. The tournament was won by Efim Bogoljubow.

Table and results

References 

USSR Chess Championships
Championship
Chess
1925 in chess
1925 in the Soviet Union
Chess